I Saw The Devil Last Night And Now The Sun Shines Bright is the first studio album from Moros Eros, released on Victory Records in 2006.

Track listing
"Today is the Day" – 4:00
"When I Wake" – 3:23
"Short of the Shore" – 3:05
"I Saw The Devil Last Night" – 4:09
"And Now The Sun Shines Bright" – 3:29
"Insane and Speechless" – 3:12
"I Will Come Back Again" – 3:41
"Make Me an Angel" – 3:08
"Madness Seems So Normal" – 6:03
"Satan Has a Heart of Gold" – 2:32

Singles
"Today is the Day"

External links
 Official Site
 Moros Eros' MySpace

2006 debut albums
Moros Eros albums
Victory Records albums